Blitz is a 2011 British action thriller film directed by Elliott Lester and starring Jason Statham, Paddy Considine, Aidan Gillen and David Morrissey. The film is based on the novel of the same name by Ken Bruen, which features his recurring characters Detective Sergeant Tom Brant and Chief Inspector James Roberts. The narrative follows a violent police officer trying to catch a serial killer who has been murdering police officers in South East London.

The film was released in the United Kingdom on 20 May 2011.

Plot 
A serial killer is targeting police officers in South East London. After two police constables are shot dead and Chief Inspector Bruce Roberts (Mark Rylance) is bludgeoned to death, the hunt for the killer's identity begins.

Sergeant Porter Nash (Paddy Considine) is transferred to the South East London branch of the police to head the investigation, even though Nash is an outsider and widely ridiculed by his fellow officers for being openly gay. To his surprise he finds an unlikely ally in the hot-headed, gruff Detective Sergeant Tom Brant (Jason Statham), who has a history of violent incidents.

While the investigation is ongoing, PC Elizabeth Falls (Zawe Ashton) is visited by a friend, a young gang member nicknamed Metal, who is afraid his gang might have actually killed someone. Promising him to look into the situation, Falls contacts Detective Inspector Craig Stokes (Luke Evans), who agrees to help if Falls goes on a date with him.

One of Brant's informants, Radnor (Ned Dennehy), points Brant and Nash towards a man named Barry Weiss (Aidan Gillen) who recently bragged about setting a police dog on fire, "for practice". Although Brant and Nash visit Weiss' flat, they cannot immediately find any evidence against him. Brant recognises Weiss as the man he beat up in a fight in a billiard hall a year earlier. Unknown to either of them, Radnor decides to conduct an investigation of his own and eventually discovers the seemingly abandoned car where Weiss keeps the trophies of his kills, confirming that Weiss is the killer.
 
Meanwhile, Weiss contacts a newspaper reporter, Harold Dunlop (David Morrissey), to make sure his murders get enough coverage in the press. Weiss promises to keep Dunlop updated about his murders and declares he wishes to be known as Blitz. Soon after, Dunlop is also contacted by Radnor who is interested in selling his information for a high price. Although Radnor leads Dunlop to Weiss' car, he is killed by Weiss before he can disclose Weiss' name. Dunlop then alerts the police to the car, but they find it empty.

Brant and a fellow police constable come to realize that all of Blitz's victims so far have been police officers who have arrested Weiss in the past and that PC Falls is most likely the next victim. Falls, after coming home from her date with Stokes, is attacked by Weiss but saved by Metal, who is killed in the ensuing struggle. Before Weiss can attack Falls again, the police arrive.

Brant and Nash decide to release a picture of Weiss to the media to flush him out, which eventually, after a lengthy chase, leads to Weiss' capture. There is no concrete evidence against Weiss however, so after 48 hours and an interrogation which does not yield results, the police are forced to let Weiss go. Exasperated, Brant and Nash devise a plot to trick Weiss, knowing that Weiss will want to take revenge on Brant for the billiard hall fight.

Weiss infiltrates the funeral of Chief Inspector Roberts, dressed in Roberts' uniform which he had stolen after murdering him. During the service, Brant leaves, followed by Weiss. Brant leads Weiss to the top of a parking garage, only to reveal that Brant and Nash had switched places along the route. Surprised by a hidden Brant, Weiss is mercilessly beaten, overpowered and relieved of his gun. Explaining that they will never find enough evidence to convict Weiss legally, Brant concludes that they are now in a convenient situation: since Weiss is dressed as a police officer, and Brant has Blitz's gun, they can shoot him with his own gun, and it will look as if Weiss was just another of Blitz's victims.

After Weiss is killed, Brant sets the dogs free on Dunlop to chase him for writing articles against him and the police for coverage.

Cast
 Jason Statham as DS Tom Brant
 Paddy Considine as Porter Nash, an acting inspector and Tom's partner.
 Aidan Gillen as Barry "Blitz" Weiss, a deranged serial cop killer.
 David Morrissey as Harold Dunlop
 Zawe Ashton as WPC Elizabeth Falls
 Luke Evans as DI Craig Stokes
 Mark Rylance as CI Bruce Roberts
 Nicky Henson as Superintendent Brown
 Ned Dennehy as Radnor
 Ron Donachie as Cross

Production
The film's script was written by Nathan Parker. The film was shot in London in August 2010. Blitz was the first film produced by Lionsgate UK.

Reception
Blitz received mixed reviews from critics. On Rotten Tomatoes the film has an approval rating of 48% based on reviews from 25 critics.

David Hughes of Empire gave the film 3 out of 5 and wrote: "A rough-cut crime thriller that sees Jason Statham back on familiar turf and doing what he does best."
Cath Clarke of The Guardian gave the film a positive review and wrote: "Who knows, we might be looking at the evolution of the guilty-pleasure movie - padded out with top-drawer talent to spare audience blushes."

Box office
Blitz grossed a worldwide total of $15,774,948. The film earned a further $3,065,744 from Domestic DVD & Blu-ray sales.

References

External links
 
 
 Blitz at The Numbers
 Blitz at the Official Website
Blitz at Rotten Tomatoes

2011 films
2011 action thriller films
2011 crime action films
2011 crime thriller films
2010s chase films
2010s police films
2010s serial killer films
British action thriller films
British chase films
British crime thriller films
British police films
British serial killer films
Films about criminals
Films about murder
Films based on crime novels
Films based on Irish novels
Films directed by Elliott Lester
Films produced by Donald Kushner
Films scored by Ilan Eshkeri
Films set in London
Films shot in London
Lionsgate films
2010s English-language films
2010s British films